WBPL may refer to:

 WBPL-LP, a radio station
 UDP-2,3-diacetamido-2,3-dideoxyglucuronic acid 2-epimerase, an enzyme
 West Branch Public Library (West Branch, Michigan) 
 WBPL76, a twitch streaming channel